The Babadishvili (also Babadishi, ბაბადიში) is a Georgian noble family claimed to have sprung off the royal Bagrationi dynasty of Kakheti in the 17th century.

Prince Ioann of Georgia (1768–1830) reports that the Babadishvili descend from the Kakhetian ruler Imām Qulī Khān (1678–1722), “corrected” by some modern genealogists to Joseph, a supposed grandson of Teimuraz I of Kakheti (1589–1663). Professor Cyril Toumanoff considers the family to be related to the Beburishvili (ბებურიშვილი), possible descendants of the medieval house of Donauri.

The family were entitled as the princes (tavadi) of the third rank in Georgia, and confirmed as knyaz of the Russian Empire in 1850.

References 

B
Noble families of Georgia (country)
Russian noble families
Georgian-language surnames